Koshkonong may refer to:

Places
United States
Koshkonong, Missouri
Koshkonong (community), Wisconsin, an unincorporated community
Koshkonong Manor, Wisconsin, an unincorporated community
Koshkonong Mounds, Wisconsin, an unincorporated community
Koshkonong, Wisconsin, a town 
Fort Koshkonong, a historical location in Wisconsin
Lake Koshkonong, Wisconsin, a census-designated place 
Lake Koshkonong, a reservoir in southern Wisconsin